Robert Hustin (born 13 October 1886, date of death unknown) was a Belgian footballer. He played in ten matches for the Belgium national football team from 1905 to 1909.

References

External links
 

1886 births
Year of death missing
Belgian footballers
Belgium international footballers
Place of birth missing
Association football goalkeepers